C. Donald Alston is a retired major general in the United States Air Force.

Career
Alston graduated from the United States Air Force Academy in 1978. He was then sent to Sheppard Air Force Base and Vandenberg Air Force Base for intercontinental ballistic missile combat crew training. In 1979, he became a deputy missile combat crew commander with the 571st Strategic Missile Squadron and the 390th Strategic Missile Wing. With the 390th, he also served as an instructor. In 1981, he was named a LGM-25C Titan II missile combat crew commander with the 570th Strategic Missile Squadron before returning to the 390th as an emergency war order training instructor in 1982.

From 1984 to 1987, Alston served as chief, Emergency War Order Training Branch and chief, Plans Division, Directorate of Missiles, Headquarters 15th Air Force. In 1987, he became Congressional inquiries officer, United States House of Representatives, Air Force legislative liaison in the Office of the United States Secretary of the Air Force. He later became liaison officer. In 1991, he was named executive assistant to the Secretary of the Air Force.

Alston held command of the 12th Missile Squadron from 1993 to 1994. In 1995, he became deputy director, Commander's Action Group, Headquarters Air Force Space Command at Peterson Air Force Base. He later became executive officer to the vice commander, as well as chief, Requirements Integration Branch and chief, Integration Division, Directorate of Plans at Headquarters Air Force Space Command.

From 1999 to 2001, he served as commander of the 341st Operations Group at Malmstrom Air Force Base before returning to Peterson Air Force Base as vice commander of the 21st Space Wing. He was then given command of the 341st Space Wing at Malmstrom before again returning to Headquarters Air Force Space Command as assistant director, air and space operations.

In 2005, Alston deployed to serve in the Iraq War with the Multi-National Force - Iraq. He served as deputy chief of staff, strategic communications, and chief, Communications Division, Strategic Effects of the Mult-National Force – Iraq. Additionally, he served as the command's spokesperson.

After returning to the United States, Alston was named director of air, space and information operations at Headquarters Air Force Space Command. In 2007, he was transferred to The Pentagon and became director, space and nuclear operations in the Office of the Deputy Chief of Staff for Air, Space and Information Operations, Plans and Requirements. He later became director, nuclear operations, and assistant chief of staff, strategic defense and nuclear integration.

In 2010, Alston was named commander of the Twentieth Air Force. In June 2012, Alston retired from military service, and was replaced as commander of the Twentieth Air Force.

Awards he has received include the Air Force Distinguished Service Medal, the Legion of Merit with oak leaf cluster, the Bronze Star Medal, the Defense Meritorious Service Medal, the Meritorious Service Medal with four oak leaf clusters, the Joint Service Commendation Medal, the Air Force Commendation Medal with oak leaf cluster, the Air Force Achievement Medal with oak leaf cluster, the Outstanding Unit Award with silver and three oak leaf clusters, the Organizational Excellence Award, the Combat Readiness Medal, the National Defense Service Medal with service star and the Iraq Campaign Medal.

Education
United States Air Force Academy
Golden Gate University
Maxwell School of Citizenship and Public Affairs – Syracuse University

References

United States Air Force generals
Recipients of the Air Force Distinguished Service Medal
Recipients of the Legion of Merit
United States Air Force personnel of the Iraq War
United States Air Force Academy alumni
Golden Gate University alumni
Maxwell School of Citizenship and Public Affairs alumni
Living people
Year of birth missing (living people)